First Presbyterian Church is a historic church at 400 Orange Street in Abilene, Texas.

The Gothic Revival style building was constructed in 1924 and added to the National Register of Historic Places in 1992.

See also

National Register of Historic Places listings in Taylor County, Texas

References

External links

Official website of congregation

Presbyterian churches in Texas
Churches on the National Register of Historic Places in Texas
Gothic Revival church buildings in Texas
Churches completed in 1924
20th-century Presbyterian church buildings in the United States
Buildings and structures in Abilene, Texas
Churches in Taylor County, Texas
National Register of Historic Places in Taylor County, Texas